Manakkayam is a small village located near Chittar in Pathanamthitta district of Kerala state, India.

References 

Villages in Pathanamthitta district